Local Business is the third album by the American punk/indie rock band Titus Andronicus. It was released on October 22, 2012 via XL.  The first single, "In a Big City", was posted in the band's blog on September 19, 2012.

A more stripped down record than their previous efforts, Local Business was recorded live in the studio with almost no overdubs, creating an album that was "plug-in-and-play" ready, helping the band sound as close as possible to the album when playing live.

The album received positive reviews and was listed at #38 on Rolling Stone's list of the top 50 albums of 2012, saying "These Jersey boys might be America's most desperately ambitious, righteously exciting punk-rock flamethrowers."

Track listing

Personnel

Titus Andronicus
 Patrick Stickles – guitar, lead vocals
 Julian Veronesi – bass, vocals
 Liam Betson - Guitar, vocals
 Eric Harm – Drums, percussion, vocals
 Adam Reich – Guitar, vocals, engineer

Additional musicians
 Kevin McMahon – Guitar, mixing, percussion, producer, recording, vocals
 Owen Pallett – violin
 Steve Harm - harmonica
 Elio DeLuca – Piano, electric piano

References

2012 albums
Titus Andronicus (band) albums
XL Recordings albums